The Liberty Flames and Lady Flames are the athletics teams of Liberty University, in Lynchburg, Virginia, United States. They are a member of the NCAA Division I level in 20 sports. LU is a member of the ASUN Conference for most sports. Two sports that are not sponsored by the ASUN are housed elsewhere. Women's swimming competes in the Coastal Collegiate Sports Association. The field hockey team was a member of the Northern Pacific Field Hockey Conference before that league's demise after the 2014 season. After playing the 2015 season as an independent, the team joined the Big East Conference in 2016. In football, Liberty participates in the NCAA Division I Football Bowl Subdivision as an independent. The mascot, Sparky, is frequently seen at events. Liberty University is the second youngest school in NCAA Division I, founded in 1971 (the youngest, Florida Gulf Coast University, was founded in 1991 with instruction starting in 1997). As a member of the Big South Conference, Liberty regularly competed for the Sasser Cup, which is the trophy for the university which has the best sports program among the member institutions. Liberty won the Sasser Cup 10 times, the most in Big South Conference history.

On February 16, 2017, the NCAA approved Liberty's football program move to the FBS for the 2018 season. Liberty has competed as an FBS independent since that time. On May 17, 2018, it was announced that the Flames would move from the Big South to the ASUN starting in 2018.

Liberty has been announced as a future member of Conference USA effective no later than July 2023.

Conference affiliations 
 Big South Conference (1991–2018)
 ASUN Conference (2018–present)
 Conference USA (Beginning 2023)

Athletics

Men's
 Baseball
 Basketball
 Cross country
 Football
 Golf
 Soccer
 Tennis
 Indoor and outdoor track and field

Women's
 Basketball
 Cross country
 Field hockey
 Lacrosse
 Soccer
 Softball
 Swimming
 Tennis
 Indoor and outdoor track and field
 Volleyball

Notes

Men's sports

Baseball 

The baseball program began in 1974 and has seen four alumni enter Major League Baseball, including Doug Brady, Sid Bream, Lee Guetterman, and Randy Tomlin. Liberty Baseball has appeared in three NAIA Baseball World Series, finishing fifth in 1980, 1981, and 1982. The Flames made their first appearance in the NCAA Division I Baseball Championship Tournament in 1993, after the university moved athletics to NCAA Division I in 1989. The program has since appeared in the tournament in 1998 and 2000. The program made it to the regional tournament finals in 2013 for the first time before falling to tournament host South Carolina.

Men's basketball

The Liberty Flames men's basketball program began in 1972 under head coach Dan Manley. The Flames finished 13-14 in the inaugural season. As of the 2009–10 season, the Flames have had 8 different head coaches of their men's team (Dan Manley (1972–77), Harley Swift (1977–78), Dale Gibson (1978–81), Jeff Meyer (1981–97), Randy Dunton (1997–98 and 2003–07), Mel Hankinson (1998–03), Ritchie McKay (2007–09 and 2015–present) and Dale Layer (2009–2015). As of the start of the 2019-2020 season, the Flames have an overall record of 691–723. 

Liberty has reached the postseason eight times in its NCAA Division I history. The Flames fell to North Carolina (71–51) in the first round of the 1994 NCAA tournament after winning the Big South tournament. Liberty lost to St. Joseph's (82–63) in the 2004 NCAA tournament after defeating High Point (89–44) to claim its second Big South Conference Tournament Championship.  Upon falling in the semi-finals of the Big South Conference tournament in the 2008–09 season, the Flames were invited to the inaugural CollegeInsider.com Postseason Tournament (CIT). Liberty defeated Rider in the first round before falling to James Madison in the quarterfinals. Their next postseason appearance was in 2013, when they won the Big South tournament and followed it with a loss to North Carolina A&T in the First Four of the NCAA Tournament. The 2016–17 season was the first of four consecutive seasons in which the Flames advanced to the postseason, with another CIT appearance. The Flames defeated Norfolk State and Samford before losing to UMBC (which would go on to score a historic upset of Virginia in the next season's NCAA tournament). They again made the CIT in 2018, defeating North Carolina A&T and Central Michigan before losing to UIC. In the Flames' first ASUN season of 2018–19, they won the ASUN Tournament and scored their first NCAA tournament win in an upset over Mississippi State. They lost in the second round to Virginia Tech. The Flames won the ASUN Tournament again in 2020, but the NCAA tournament was not held due to COVID-19.

Liberty won the 1980 NCCAA National Championship against Point Loma College (68–65). The 2012–13 squad saw Liberty win the Big South championship with a 15-20 (6-10 Big South) record, only the second time in NCAA history a 20-loss team played in the NCAA Division I tournament.

Football

Liberty's football program is headed by Jamey Chadwell. Liberty plays its home games at Williams Stadium.

2007 Big South Conference champions
The Liberty Flames captured their first Big South Conference football championship with a 31-0 victory over Gardner–Webb University. The Flames capped off their second year under head coach Danny Rocco with an 8-3 record and a 4-0 Big South record to claim the title. The same week, The Liberty University men's soccer team beat Radford University, 2-1, to capture the Big South Conference soccer title and its first appearance in the national tournament. Also that same week, the Liberty Women's Volleyball team shutout Winthrop in the finals of the Big South Volleyball tournament. it was the first conference championship for the volleyball team since 2001. The Liberty Men's and Women's cross country teams also won the Big South Championship with Josh McDougal, Jordan McDougal and Jarvis Jelen sweeping the top 3 positions in the men's race for the third straight year.

2008 Big South Conference champions
Topping its 2007 performance, Liberty ran its unbeaten Big South streak to 11-straight games, finishing back-to-back conference championship seasons with a 30-10 victory over Gardner–Webb. The Flames finished with a 10-2 record on the year and finished the conference slate unbeaten at 5-0. Liberty's victory allowed the Flames to become the first team in Big South history to win five conference games in a season and to join Gardner–Webb as the only two teams to post consecutive unbeaten seasons. Liberty finished ranked 15th in the FCS Coaches Poll and 14th in the Sports Network Poll.

Women's sports

Women's basketball

The University gained some media attention in the winter of 2005 when their women's basketball team, the Lady Flames led by Katie Feenstra, made the Sweet Sixteen of the 2005 NCAA Division I women's basketball tournament, being labeled a "Cinderella" team.  After defeating fourth-seeded Penn State and fifth-seeded DePaul, the Flames' winning streak was halted by top-seeded LSU.  Feenstra was later drafted by the San Antonio Silver Stars (now Las Vegas Aces) of the WNBA.
Most recently, the Lady Flames competed for the Big South's 2012 regular season and tournament championships. In the regular season, the Lady Flames went 16-2 in conference play to clinch the Big South's regular season title. In addition, the Lady Flames won the Big South Conference Tournament, beating High Point University 81-73.

Softball

Track and field

Championships
Sam Chelanga holds the NCAA record for the 10,000 meters run with a time of 27:08.49 set at the Payton Jordan Cardinal Invitational at Palo Alto, California on May 1, 2010. Competing in cross country and the 5,000 and 10,000 meters, between 2009 and 2011, he won four NCAA Division I championship gold medals and three silvers. Josh McDougall won the cross country title in 2007, after finishing third the previous year. In 2016, Head Coach Brant Tolsma notched his 100th conference championship over a 31-year coaching career with the Flames. Tolsma received Women's Coach of the Year honors, his 63rd Big South Coach of the Year Award. The Lady Flames cross country team won their first conference title since 2012. That year the Liberty's men's cross country squad finished runner-up behind Campbell University. The Flames were runner up three years in a row and have posted 14 consecutive top-two Big South finishes.

Club sports

Men's ice hockey 

The men's ice hockey team competes at the Division I level of the American Collegiate Hockey Association (ACHA). The team plays at the LaHaye Ice Center.

Men's ice hockey finished the 2009–2010 season ranked 10th in the ACHA DI. LU went 23–3–3 and won a bid to the 2010 ACHA Division I Championships in Chicago, Illinois, The team lost 7–3 in the first round to Arizona State. In addition to the ACHA DI team the University also fields JV teams playing at the ACHA DII and DIII levels.

Liberty won the University Hockey League Championship in the 2004–05 season.

Women's ice hockey 
The women's ice hockey team competes at the Division I level of the American Collegiate Hockey Association. The team plays at the LaHaye Ice Center. The team finished the 2009–2010 season ranked fifth and qualified for the 2010 Women's ACHA Division I National Championship Tournament, held in Blaine, Minnesota. LU 10–2 in pool play, losing 4–2 to Rhode Island and 1–0 to Penn State.

In 2012-2013 Liberty made its first championship appearance, ultimately losing to Minnesota.

2014-2015 Liberty won its first National Championship against Miami with a final score of 4-1. Liberty and Miami in 2016 season would meet again in the championship this time the Lady Flames would lose 3-2.

Liberty would the  championship in 2017 against Adrian College. Liberty the following year would win back to back championships this time defeating Lindenwood University – Belleville 5-2. The Lady Flames would go onto winning another championship the following season. With a “three-peat”, beating Lindenwood University 3-1 in the finals.

It was the fourth national title overall for Liberty (19-1, 15-1 ACHA), matching the Penn State Lady Lions record total. Penn State (14-9-1) were the only other ACHA DI women’s team to accomplish the feat of capturing three consecutive crowns.

Men's wrestling 
In 2011, Liberty announced that it would no longer sponsor a varsity wrestling team, citing Title IX concerns. The team had competed as an independent NCAA Division I program from 2006–2011 since the Big South Conference does not host a wrestling championship. Liberty University previously had wrestling teams from 1974 to 1994. The reinstatement of the wrestling program was aided by the support of the Liberty University Wrestling Foundation.
Since its reclassification in 2012, the wrestling team has participated in the National Collegiate Wrestling Association  where it has won four national duals titles and four grand national titles.

Facilities

Williams Stadium

Williams Stadium is the football stadium located on the campus of Liberty University.  The stadium was built in 1989 and plays host to the football team. The stadium originally seated 12,000 fans. The first phase of a planned renovation was completed October 2, 2010. Williams Stadium now has a five-story press tower. In addition, 7,200 more seats were installed by adding a second deck to the home side of the stadium and lengthening both the east and west stands of the stadium. The seating capacity is currently 25,000.

Liberty Arena

Liberty Arena is a 4,000-seat multi-purpose arena completed in 2020 that is now the primary home of the Flames and Lady Flames basketball teams, as well as women's volleyball. Located next to the Vines Center, the former home of the aforementioned teams, and connected to that facility by a tunnel, it was officially opened on November 23, 2020, with the first event, a Lady Flames basketball game, held on December 1.

Vines Center

Vines Center is an 8,085-seat multi-purpose arena. It was built in 1990 and was home to the Flames and Lady Flames basketball teams, as well as women's volleyball, until the opening of Liberty Arena. The Vines Center was also home to men's wrestling until that program was downgraded from varsity to club status in 2011. It hosted the Big South Conference men's basketball tournament from 1995–98, and also all rounds of the tourney except for the first round in 2003 and 2004.  In the fall of 2008 the Vines Center underwent a major renovation of all seating.  New red-and-blue cushioned seats were installed and new blue plastic game seats were put in place. On August 28, 2009, university Chancellor Jerry Falwell, Jr. announced that the University planned to upgrade seating in the Vines center from 8,000 to 11,000 for athletic contests and 12,000 for convocations. A further addition to the facility was completed in 2013, featuring new practice courts, locker rooms, and coaches' office for the basketball teams. The Vines Center remains in use for university events, and will still be available for high-demand sporting events.

LaHaye Ice Center

LaHaye Ice Center was built in 2005 and opened in 2006. The Ice Center has a 3,000-seat capacity and is the home of the Flames and Lady Flames hockey teams.

Liberty Baseball Stadium

Liberty Baseball Stadium is a 2,500-seat baseball stadium opened in 2013. It is the home field of the Liberty Flames baseball team.

Other
 Osborne Stadium is a 1,000-seat natural grass stadium and home to the men's and women's soccer teams, as well as women's lacrosse – one of the newest athletic programs at Liberty. Osborne was built in 2009 and is the newest athletic facility on campus.
 Tolsma Indoor Track Center is located in Liberty's Campus North building. The indoor track was constructed in 2006 and has a 1,000-seat capacity. Amenities include a flat 200-meter oval track with four lanes around the curves, eight-lane straightaways, a pair of long jump/triple jump runways, a pole vault runway, a high jump apron, and a throwing circle.
 Liberty Softball Field is a 500-seat natural grass outdoor softball stadium built in 1993. It is home to the Flames softball team.
 Matthes-Hopkins Track Complex is an outdoor track complex built in 1989 for the track teams. The complex seats 500 and includes an eight-lane, 400-meter track, four long jump/triple jump pits, three pole vault runways, a high jump apron, two javelin runways, two shot put rings, and a hammer/discus throwing area. The facility has hosted six of the 15 Big South Men's and Women's Outdoor Track & Field Championships.
 LU Tennis Courts

Footnotes

References

External links